Pic de l'Estany Fondo is a mountain of Catalonia, Spain.

See also
List of mountains in Catalonia

References

Mountains of Catalonia
Mountains of the Pyrenees